Artlish Caves Provincial Park is a provincial park on Vancouver Island in British Columbia, Canada.

History and conservation
The name of the Artlish River is derived from the A'licath (Artlish) natives, part of the Kyuquot confederacy. The first recorded reference to the caves is in a 1932 report to the Canadian Geological Survey, although the caves were certainly known to local hunters, miners and timber cruisers prior to that.

Increased publicity and concern over potential damage by timber harvesting led to a reserve around the two caves conferred by the BC Forest Service in 1977. This was elevated to provincial park status in 1996. The park protects Vancouver Island's last remaining undisturbed karst unit that includes a major river cave. The area provides winter habitat and a migration corridor for Roosevelt elk, as well as habitat for sockeye, Coho, Chinook, and pink salmon, steelhead and rainbow trout. The park also protects coastal western hemlock and western red cedar as well as some amabilis fir and Sitka spruce.

Location
A secondary logging road into the park was deactivated in 2009.

Size
 in size.

References

 The Canadian Caver Vol 10 no 1.

External links
Artlish Caves Provincial Park

Provincial parks of British Columbia
Northern Vancouver Island
Caves of British Columbia
1996 establishments in British Columbia
Protected areas established in 1996